Nicholas Kiptanui Kemboi (born 18 December 1989 in Kericho) is a Kenyan middle-distance runner who specializes in the 1500 metres.

He competed at the 2008 Summer Olympics but did not advance past 1500 metres heats.

He holds the 1500 metres world youth best performance of 3:33.72 minutes, achieved in August 2006 in Zurich.

Achievements

Personal bests 
800 metres – 1:47.38 (2008)
1500 metres – 3:31.54 (2010)
Mile run – 3:50.83 (2008)

References

External links

1989 births
Living people
Kenyan male middle-distance runners
Olympic athletes of Kenya
Athletes (track and field) at the 2008 Summer Olympics
People from Kericho County